John Elbert Collins (September 20, 1913 – October 4, 2001) was an American jazz guitarist who was a member of the Nat King Cole trio.

Career
A native of Alabama, Collins grew up in Chicago. When he was fourteen, her performed with his mother, Georgia Gorham, who was a jazz pianist. At twenty-one, he played with Art Tatum in the 1930s, followed by Roy Eldridge, Billie Holiday, Lester Young, Fletcher Henderson, and Benny Carter. At the end of the 1930s, he started playing electric guitar.

Collins served in the U.S. Army during the 1940s, then returned to his musical career, working with Slam Stewart, Kenny Clarke, Ike Quebec, Eddie "Lockjaw" Davis, Erroll Garner, Billy Taylor, Tadd Dameron, Coleman Hawkins, Artie Shaw, and Vic Dickenson.

Collins replaced Irving Ashby as the guitarist for the Nat King Cole trio. He was a member of the trio until Cole died in 1965. Collins then worked with vocalist Patti Page, followed by several years with Bobby Troup. In the early 1970s, he worked with Ray Brown, Carmen McRae, and Snooky Young. Then he spent time teaching in Los Angeles.  He appears on the 1983 album Jackson, Johnson, Brown & Company with Milt Jackson on vibes, J. J. Johnson on trombone, Ray Brown on bass, Tom Ranier on piano, and  Roy McCurdy on drums.

He recorded The Incredible John Collins, his only album as a leader, with Jimmy Woode and Alvin Queen.

Collins was inducted into the Alabama Jazz Hall of Fame in 1993. He died of cancer on October 4, 2001 at the age of 88.

Discography

As leader
 The Incredible John Collins (Nilva)

As sideman
With Hoyt Axton
 Hoyt Axton Sings Bessie Smith (Exodus, 1965)

With Ruth Brown
 Ruth Brown (Atlantic, 1957)

With Natalie Cole
 Unforgettable... with Love (Elektra, 1991)

With Nat King Cole
 After Midnight (Capitol, 1957)

With Harry Edison
Sweets for the Sweet Taste of Love (Vee-Jay, 1964)

With Ted Gärdestad
 Blue Virgin Isles (Polar, 1978)

With Illinois Jacquet
 Groovin' with Jacquet (Clef, 1951–53 [1956])

With Peggy Lee
 Then Was Then – Now Is Now! (Capitol Records, 1965)
 Guitars a là Lee (Capitol Records, 1966)

With Carmen McRae
 You're Lookin' at Me (A Collection of Nat King Cole Songs) (Concord, 1983)
 Any Old Time (Denon, 1986)

With Maria Muldaur
 Waitress in a Donut Shop (Reprise, 1974)

With Billy Taylor
 Piano Panorama (Atlantic, 1952)

With Joe Williams
 I Just Want to Sing (Delos, 1985)

References

 The Complete Jazz at the Philharmonic on Verve, 1944–49, 10-CD box-set.

1913 births
2001 deaths
Guitarists from Alabama
Musicians from Montgomery, Alabama
African-American jazz guitarists
American male guitarists
King Cole Trio members
20th-century American guitarists
Jazz musicians from Alabama
American male jazz musicians
20th-century American male musicians
United States Army personnel of World War II